Duke of Arco is a hereditary title in the peerage of Spain, accompanied by the dignity of Grandee and granted in 1715 by Philip V to Alonso Manrique de Lara, 4th Count of Montehermoso, knight of the Order of the Golden Fleece and his caballerizo mayor for two periods, 1721-1724 and 1724-1737.

The title makes reference to the small village of Arco in Cañaveral, province of Cáceres, where the grantee held a lordship.

Succession
As with other Spanish noble titles, the dukedom of Arco descended according to cognatic primogeniture, meaning that females could inherit the title if they had no brothers (or if their brothers had no issue), such as in the 7th Duchess's case. The rules were relaxed in 2006, since when the eldest child (regardless of gender) can automatically succeed to noble family titles.

The 7th Duchess married Fernando de Soto y Colón de Carvajal (1930-2001), V Count of Puerto Hermoso, X Marquess of Arienzo, and it is expected that their son, Manuel de Soto y Falcó, will succeed to his mother's dukedom.

Notable figures 

Historical accounts mentioned some notable personages who held the title. For instance, there was the very first duke Don Alonso Manrique, who also held the positions caballerizo mayor and "montero mayor" (Master of the Royal Hunt). In 1839, the duke who held this position represented the hacendados (landowners) in a petition to the civil governor of Malaga asking for irrigation reforms.

List of Dukes of Arco

See also 
 List of dukes in the peerage of Spain
 List of current Grandees of Spain

References

Bibliography
 

Dukedoms of Spain
Lists of dukes